In civil engineering, a wheel tractor-scraper (also known as a 'tournapull') is a type of heavy equipment used for earthmoving. It has a pan/hopper for loading and carrying material. The pan has a tapered horizontal front cutting edge that cuts into the soil like a carpenter's  plane or cheese slicer and fills the hopper which has a movable ejection system. The horsepower of the machine, depth of the cut, type of material, and slope of the cut area affect how quickly the pan is filled. 

When full, the pan is raised, the apron is closed, and the scraper transports its load to the fill area. There the pan height is set and the lip is opened (the lip is what the bottom edge of the apron is called), so that the ejection system can be engaged for dumping the load. The forward momentum or speed of the machine affects how big an area is covered with the load. A high pan height and slow speed will dump the load over a short distance. With the pan set close to the ground, a higher speed will spread the material more thinly over a larger area.

In an "elevating scraper" a conveyor moves material from the cutting edge into the hopper.

Design 

The scraper is a large piece of equipment which is used in mining, construction, agriculture and other earthmoving applications. The rear part has a vertically moveable hopper (also known as the bowl) with a sharp horizontal front edge. The hopper can be hydraulically lowered and raised. When the hopper is lowered, the front edge cuts into the soil or clay like a plane and fills the hopper. When the hopper is full ( heaped, depending on type) it is raised, and closed with a vertical blade (known as the apron). The scraper can transport its load to the fill area where the blade is raised, the back panel of the hopper, or the ejector, is hydraulically pushed forward and the load tumbles out. Then the empty scraper returns to the cut site and repeats the cycle.

On the 'elevating scraper' the bowl is filled by a type of conveyor arrangement fitted with a horizontal flights to move the material engaged by the cutting edge into the bowl as the machine moves forward. Elevating scrapers do not require assistance from push-tractors. The pioneer developer of the elevating scraper was Hancock Manufacturing Company of Lubbock, Texas USA. Self-propelled scrapers were invented by R. G. LeTourneau in the 1930s. His company called them Tournahoppers. This concept was further developed by LeTourneau Westinghouse Company. Most current scrapers have two axles, although historically tri-axle configurations were dominant.

Scrapers can be very efficient on short hauls where the cut and fill areas are close together and have sufficient length to fill the hopper. Multiple scrapers can work together in a push-pull fashion but this requires a long cut area.

Configurations 

 Open bowl: usually requires a push-cat (bulldozer or similar) to assist in loading.
 Elevating scraper: self-loading as it uses an elevator to load material; requires no push-cat.
 Tandem scrapers: separate tractor and scraper engines provide greater power, and better traction in steep or slippery areas
 Tandem Push-Pull: concentrates the combined horsepower of two such machines onto one cutting edge.  The push-pull attachment allows two individual scrapers to act as a self-loading system, typically loading both machines in less than a minute, one after the other.
 Auger: uses vertically mounted auger in the bowl to pull material upwards.
 Pull type scraper: uses agricultural tractor, articulated dump truck, or bulldozer to pull.  Pull type scrapers can be utilized individually or two or three units can be pulled behind a single tractor.

See also 
 Fresno scraper, a horse pulled ancestor of the modern scraper
 Grader, an open-bladed rear-engined machine that scrapes or spreads out excess material.
 Laser Machine Control

References 

Engineering vehicles